Martín Félix Ubaldi (11 November 1969) is an Argentine former football striker.

He played with Club Atlético Independiente, Atlas, Tigres UANL during the 1995-96 season, Atlante, Puebla, UNAM and Toros Neza. His nickname was El Motorcito (The Little Engine).

References

External links
 Martín Félix Ubaldi at BDFA.com.ar 

1969 births
Living people
Argentine footballers
Argentine expatriate footballers
Club Atlético Independiente footballers
Atlas F.C. footballers
Tigres UANL footballers
Atlante F.C. footballers
Club Puebla players
Club Universidad Nacional footballers
Expatriate footballers in Mexico
Liga MX players
Toros Neza footballers
Association football forwards
Footballers from Buenos Aires